Pani Makuluwo is a 2017 Sri Lankan Sinhala cyber crime thriller film directed by Isuru Weerasinghe Mudali and produced by U.A. Palliyaguru for Cloud Films. It stars Sanath Gunathilake and Aishara Athukorala in lead roles along with Dineth de Silva and Bangladeshi actress Priota Farelin. Music composed by Nadeeka Guruge. Music composed by Seneth Dayantha. It is the 1275th Sri Lankan film in the Sinhala cinema.

Plot

Cast
 Sanath Gunathilake as Ranaweera
 Aishara Athukorala as Nilu
 Dineth de Silva as Cyber boyfriend
 Priota Farelin as Shashi
 Duminda Harshana as Spy
 Thilini Jayamali as Servant
 Chalith Manuranga as CID agent
 Raseli Chandrajithya as CID agent
 Poornima Vidushika as Cyber love interest

Song

References

External links
චිත්‍රපටය කළාට පසුව පැත්තකට වෙන්න මං කැමැතියි

2010s Sinhala-language films
2017 films